The Barui class (バルイ) was a class of steam tank locomotives of the Chosen Government Railway (Sentetsu) with 4-6-4 wheel arrangement. The "Baru" name came from the American naming system for steam locomotives, under which locomotives with 4-6-4 wheel arrangement were called "Baltic".

To meet the needs of ever-increasing freight traffic, four were built by the Baldwin Locomotive Works of the United States for Sentetsu in 1913, who used them primarily on the Gyeongwon Line. Another two were built in 1914, and subsequently a further six were added, and a total of twelve were in service at the time of Japan's defeat in the Pacific War in 1945.

Initially numbered バルイ501 through バルイ512, they received the バルイ1 through バルイ12 numbers in Sentetsu's general renumbering of 1938.

After the partition of Korea, three went to the Korean National Railroad in South Korea, where they were called 발틱1 (or 발틱) class (Baltik), and nine to the Korean State Railway in North Korea, where they were designated 바루하 class (Paruha).

References

Locomotives of Korea
Locomotives of South Korea
Locomotives of North Korea
Railway locomotives introduced in 1913
4-6-4 locomotives
Baldwin locomotives